The 62nd season of the Campeonato Gaúcho kicked off on July 20, 1982 and ended in November 28, 1982. Twelve teams participated. Internacional won their 27th title. Guarany de Bagé and São José were relegated.

Participating teams

System 
The championship would have two stages.:

 First phase: The twelve clubs played each other in a double round-robin system. The six best teams qualified to the Final phase, with the best teams and the best hinterland teams in each round earning one bonus point. the bottom two teams in the sum of both rounds were relegated.
 Final phase: The six remaining teams played each other in a double round-robin system; the team with the most points won the title.

Championship

First phase

First round

Results

Second round

Results

Final standings

Final phase

References 

Campeonato Gaúcho seasons
Gaúcho